Catholic Medical Center (CMC) is a 330-licensed bed (with 258 beds staffed) not-for-profit full-service acute care hospital located in the West Side area of Manchester, New Hampshire, United States. CMC offers medical-surgical care with more than 26 subspecialties, inpatient and outpatient services, diagnostic imaging and a 30-bed 24-hour emergency department. Norris Cotton Cancer Center at CMC offers medical oncology and infusion services. In September 2022, the hospital was the subject of a highly damaging two-part exposé reported by The Boston Globe's Spotlight investigative journalism team surrounding the alleged coverup of frequent surgical malpractice by a former surgeon.

Overview
A rooftop helipad allows for incoming medevac transport of the most critically ill patients from the region.

Catholic Medical Center is home to the nationally recognized New England Heart Institute (NEHI)  which provides a full range of cardiac services and is a pioneer in offering innovative surgical procedures. As one of the largest cardiac hospitals north of Boston, CMC has performed more than 70,000 invasive cardiac procedures, including an average of 400 open heart surgeries each year. The New England Heart Institute is home to the Cholesterol Management Center. NEHI also offers cardiovascular rehabilitation and wellness education to help patients recover in a multi-step program of exercise, education, risk factor management and development of a healthy lifestyle. The New England Heart Institute is a comprehensive cardiac center with 32 board certified cardiologists, CT surgeons and mid-level providers who diagnose and treat cardiovascular disease.

History
In May 2002, CMC opened The Mom's Place maternity center. Approximately 1,200 mothers use The Mom's Place and CMC's Special Care Nursery to deliver their babies each year.

CMC is one of the few hospitals in New England using the DaVinci Institute Surgical System to perform life-saving surgery with fewer complications. In 2009, CMC acquired a second robot to meet the increasing demand for minimally invasive surgeries. It was the first hospital in southern New Hampshire to utilize the 64-Slice CT Scanner to provide faster, less invasive diagnosis of cardiac disease. CMC is equipped with an Achieva Quasar dual 3.0T MRI from Phillips Medical Systems, allowing for higher resolution images in less time. The orthopedic surgeons now have access to the new O-ARM Imaging System, a high definition CT scan that provides real-time three-dimensional images during spine surgery. It also offers digital mammography.

Rankings & recognitions
Catholic Medical Center is one of only three ranked regional medical centers in New Hampshire by U.S. News & World Report, and is currently ranked second in the state behind Dartmouth-Hitchcock Medical Center and tied with Concord Hospital. In 2022, it was rated "high performing" in 8 procedures and conditions, including five of six rated procedures within cardiology and cardiac surgery.

Controversies 
In September 2022, Catholic Medical Center was the subject of a two-part exposé by the Boston Globe investigative journalism team. As reported in the article, a CMC cardiac surgeon had compiled one of the worst surgical malpractice records in the United States; over the past twenty years, no physician in the country had settled more lawsuits involving the surgical death of a patient. The article outlines the extensive efforts of the CMC professional staff to prevent the surgeon from continuing to operate, and the alleged efforts of the CMC administration to suppress dissent and conceal poor outcomes in the interest of allowing the surgeon’s profitable activities to continue. This included demoting the hospital’s chief medical officer for his “attitude” after he recommended a third-party investigation, threatening the chair of the hospital’s peer-review committee with dismissal after he gathered technical information related to one of the surgeon’s alleged mistakes, and keeping patients on life support beyond all hope of recovery to protect the surgeon’s official mortality statistics. In support of their conclusions, The Globe quoted 17 current or former CMC employees on the record, including 11 physicians.

Earlier that same year, the U.S. Attorney's Office for the District of New Hampshire announced that Catholic Medical Center had agreed to pay $3.8 million "to resolve allegations" that it had participated in an illegal "kickback" scheme. According to the government's assertions, CMC had systematically compensated a local physician for directing patients to CMC for cardiac procedures. The allegations were investigated as the result of a whistle-blower lawsuit filed by a former vice president of the CMC medical staff.

As of September 2022, CMC officials have denied any wrongdoing.

References 

Hospital buildings completed in 1892
Hospitals in Hillsborough County, New Hampshire
Buildings and structures in Manchester, New Hampshire
1892 establishments in New Hampshire
Hospitals established in 1892
Trauma centers